The Kjarrá–Thervá River, located about 115 kilometers from Reykjavík in western Iceland, is a 64-kilometer glacial river known for its salmon fishing.   

The upper river, closer to the glacier, is Kjarrá; the in-between is Örnólfsdalsá; the lower river, closer to the sea and "below the fence above Örnólfsdal," is Thervá.  

Kjarrá is a tributary of the glacial river 
Hvítá, and has tributaries of its own: Litla-Thvera, Krókavatnsá, and Lambá. The river is part of the Borgarfjörður ecosystem.

Kjarrá and Thervá each have their own fishing lodge, "limited to seven rods each."

See also
 Hraunfossar, waterfalls upriver

References 

Rivers of Iceland